Eriska is a flat tidal island at the entrance to Loch Creran on the west coast of Scotland. Privately owned by the Buchanan-Smiths from 1973 until August 2016, Eriska is now owned by Creation Gem, a family-owned business from Hong Kong. The island is run as a hotel with wooded grounds. The island is evidently populated although no record for the total was provided by the census in 2001 or 2011.

Geography

The island is largely of schist and slate with the lower ground to the west as a raised beach. To the east of the bridge, there is a partly submerged crannog, or fortified dwelling, dating from the Bronze Age around 200 B.C. It is part of the Lynn of Lorn National Scenic Area, one of 40 in Scotland.

Eriska House

Eriska House was built in 1884 by the Stewarts of Appin. Built in the Scottish Baronial style by architect Hippolyte Blanc, who was highly acclaimed for his meticulous attention to detail and for a very high degree of specification in materials.

Eriska was occupied by the Blairs and Clark Hutchisons, who built the bridge over the drying channel, connecting the island to the mainland at all states of the tide. When they left in 1930 little upkeep was done until the island was purchased by the Buchanan-Smith family in 1973. The house remains essentially the same with the surrounding buildings converted to become part of the hotel.

Sculpture
Public sculptures near the shoreline  include the carved stone horse by Ronald Rae and Otter by Kenneth Robertson at Otter Point overlooking Loch Linnhe.

Footnotes

Tidal islands of Scotland
Islands of Argyll and Bute
Islands of the Inner Hebrides
Private islands of the United Kingdom